Archie Hughes may refer to:

Archie Hughes (footballer, born 1871), Scottish footballer
Archie Hughes (footballer, born 1919), Welsh footballer
Archie Hughes (rugby union) (born 2003), Welsh rugby union player